Zubří is a town in Vsetín District in the Zlín Region of the Czech Republic. It has about 5,500 inhabitants.

Etymology
The name is derived from zubr, i.e. European bison. They lived here at the time when Zubří was founded.

Geography
Zubří is located in the valley of the Rožnovská Bečva river. The northern part of the municipal territory lies in the Moravian-Silesian Beskids mountain range. The southern part with the built-up area lies in the Rožnov Furrow. The northern municipal border runs over mountain peaks of Kamenárka, Dlouhá (859 m), Krátká (767 m), and Hodorf (766 m).

History
Zubří was founded in 1310 by the lords of Krásno on the site of a hunters' settlement. It was one of the first and largest villages of the Rožnov estate. Crafts were the livelihood of the inhabitants and the village was famous for the production of besoms and embroidery.

In 2002, Zubří became a town.

Demographics

Sport
Handball club HC ROBE Zubří is based in the town. It belongs to the most successful Czech handball clubs.

The town is represented by the football club FC Zubří, founded in 1937 as SK Zubří. It plays in lower amateur tiers.

Sights
The main landmark of Zubří is the Church of Saint Catherine. It was built in 1785–1788.

The Chapel of the Holy Spirit was built in 2000. Minor sights are the sculpture group Wallachian Family by Vladimír Navrátil, monument to President Tomáš Garrigue Masaryk with an equestrian motif by Marius Kotrba, and a memorial of the executed partisans.

Koláček's Yew is a protected tree, which is about 360 years old (as of 2020).

Notable people
Jiří Svoboda (born 1941), volleyball player
Zdeněk Pavlíček (born 1952), biathlete
Tomáš Číp (born 1989), handball player
Jakub Hrstka (born 1990), handball player

Twin towns – sister cities

Zubří is twinned with:
 Furth an der Triesting, Austria
 Palárikovo, Slovakia
 Považská Bystrica, Slovakia
 Rosdorf, Germany

References

External links

 

Cities and towns in the Czech Republic
Populated places in Vsetín District
Moravian Wallachia